15 Eridani is a binary star system in the equatorial constellation of Eridanus. It is visible to the naked eye as a faint, orange-hued star with an apparent visual magnitude of 4.875. Based upon parallax measurements, the system is located around 260 light years away from the Sun. It is moving further from the Earth with a heliocentric radial velocity of 24 km/s.

The primary member, designated component A, is a magnitude 5.32 giant star with a stellar classification of K0 III. It is a red clump giant, which means it is on the horizontal branch and is generating energy through helium fusion at its core. This star has 1.44 billion years old with 2.32 times the mass of the Sun. It is radiating 72.4 times the luminosity of the Sun from its enlarged photosphere at an effective temperature of 4,960 K. The companion, component B, has a magnitude of 6.57.

References

K-type giants
Horizontal-branch stars
Binary stars
Eridanus (constellation)
Eridani, 15
Durchmusterung objects
020610
015382
0994